Labor burden is the actual cost of a company to have an employee, aside from the salary the employee earns. Labor burden costs include benefits that a company must, or chooses to, pay for employees included on their payroll. These costs include but are not limited to payroll taxes, pension costs, health insurance, dental insurance, and any other benefits that a company provides an employee.

Company paid time off such as paid sick, holiday or training time must also be considered as part of the Labor Burden as it is a cost to the company.

Labor burden cost is important to compute and understand because it includes a variety of significant costs that are often viewed as company overhead, but are in fact, costs related to employment. Many businesses fail because they focus simply on payroll and payroll taxes, and neglect to consider the entire actual cost required to enable an employee to perform their work.

Overhead should be spread out over all of a company's income-generating employees based on the hours they work (Example: A part-time employee working 20 hours a week will absorb half as much company overhead as would a full-time employee at 40 hours per week.

Fully-burdened costs for individual employees can be expressed as a yearly total to provide an estimate of how much the company will spend that year on an employee. It can also be expressed as an hourly cost by dividing the total yearly cost by the number of hours the employee will work. This number is often 50% to 150% higher than the gross hourly wage. As costs are often used as the basis for pricing services or products, this is why it is so critical to obtain an in-depth understanding of the true cost of an employee.

See also
 Direct labor cost
 Overhead (business)
 Wage

References

 

Construction